The 16th Congress of the Russian Communist Party (Bolsheviks) was held during 26 June - 13 July 1930 in Moscow. The congress of the Russian Communist Party (Bolsheviks) was attended by 1,268 voting delegates and 891 delegates with observer status. It elected the 16th Central Committee.

An exercise of devotion to Joseph Stalin, this is the last congress to be dominated by the original leadership of the Soviet Union.

Agenda of the Congress

Political report of the Central Committee (Stalin)
Organization report of the Central Committee (Kaganovich)
Report of the Central Revision Commission (Vladimirsky)
Report of the Central Control Commission (Ordzhonikidze)
Report of the All-Union Communist Party (Bolsheviks) Delegation to the Comintern (Molotov)
Completion of the five-years plan for the industry (Kuybyshev)
The Kolkhoz movement and the rise of the agriculture (Yakovlev)
Tasks of the trade unions in the reconstruction period (Shvernik)
Elections to the Party's central organs

External links
Sixteenth Congress of the CPSU (Bolshevik)  in The Great Soviet Encyclopedia, 3rd Edition (1970-1979). 

Communist Party of the Soviet Union 14
Congress
1930 conferences
June 1930 events
July 1930 events